The House of Romodanovsky was a Rurikid princely family descending from sovereign rulers of Starodub-on-the-Klyazma. Their progenitor was Prince Vasily Fyodorovich Starodubsky (Василий Фёдорович Стародубский) who changed his name to Romodanovsky after the village of Romodanovo where he lived in. Although the family was one of the first Rurikids to enter the service of the Grand Duke of Muscovy, it was in the 17th century that they finally rose to the highest offices of Muscovite Russia.

Early members 

Among Vasily's sons, one was Ivan III's okolnichi, another sat in the Boyar Duma during Vasily III's reign. Their nephew was sent by Ivan the Terrible as a Russian ambassador to Copenhagen. The latter's nephew, Prince Ivan Petrovich Romodanovsky, was killed by the Kalmucks on his way from Persia in 1607.

Since the 17th century, the family was divided into senior and cadet lines, both of which  benefited from extinction of the higher-placed families of Muscovy after the Oprichnina purges and the Time of Troubles. During the reign of the first Romanovs, the Romodanovsky came to be regarded among the noblest families of Muscovy. It was one of a few clans whose adult males were promoted boyars skipping the lower ranks like stolnik.

The most important member of the senior branch was Prince Grigory Grigorievich Romodanovsky. During the 1660s and 1670s, he was instrumental in spreading Muscovite influence in the Cossack Hetmanate, sometimes openly interfering into election of hetmans and promoting the candidates backed up by Moscow. 

Grigory's cousin, Prince Yury Ivanovich Romodanovsky, was a personal friend of Tsar Alexis and one of his most trusted courtiers. It was he who galvanized Alexis into rupture with Patriarch Nikon and announced to Nikon the tsar's anger for his having styled himself "grand sovereign". The matter ended in Nikon resigning his patriarchy.

Cadet line 

The cadet line was continued by Yury's son Fyodor Yurievich Romodanovsky, who was given the post of the head of the Preobrazhensky prikaz in 1686. His integrity and resolution won him the admiration of young Tsar Peter, who made him commander of his toy army. For his vital services to the crown Peter had him jocundly styled "His Caesarean Majesty" (кесарское величество) and "Prince Caesar" (князь-кесарь). Romodanovsky also had the right to keep his own court at Ropsha and to promote officers. 

Upon his death, the Prince-Caesar's extraordinary titles devolved upon his son, Prince Ivan Fyodorovich Romodanovsky. He was related to the tsar through his sister Feodosiya, the wife of Eudoxia Lopukhina's brother, and through his wife Anastasia Saltykova, Ivan V's sister-in-law. Despite his high position, Prince Ivan was not well suited for active service. Under Peter II of Russia, he served as governor of Moscow but retired a year before his death, which followed in 1730, whereupon the family became extinct. Princess Catherine, his only daughter and heir, was married by her first cousin, Empress Anna, to Gavrila Golovkin's son, thus bringing the Romodanovsky estates under control of that Chancellor of the Russian Empire.

This was not the end of their story, however. Seven decades later, on April 8, 1798, Emperor Paul authorized his favourite general, Nikolay Ivanovich Lodyzhensky, to take the title and arms of Princes Romodanovsky on account of his matrilineal descent from Prince Grigory Grigorievich Romodanovsky. Nikolay's descendants became known as Princes Romodanovsky-Lodyzhensky.

External links
Prosopography of the Romodanovsky family